The Bicol narrowmouth toad or Catanduanes narrow-mouthed frog (Kaloula kokacii) is a species of frog in the family Microhylidae.
It is endemic to the Philippines, where it is found in the Bicol Peninsula and Catanduanes Island.
Its natural habitats are subtropical or tropical moist lowland forests, subtropical or tropical moist montane forests, pastureland, plantations, rural gardens, and heavily degraded former forest.
It is threatened by habitat loss.

Sources

Kaloula
Amphibians of the Philippines
Endemic fauna of the Philippines
Fauna of Catanduanes
Fauna of Luzon
Amphibians described in 1992
Taxonomy articles created by Polbot